Akira Yabe (born 1 June 1946) is a Japanese professional golfer.

Yabe played on the Japan Golf Tour, winning five times. His biggest win came in 1982 in the Japan Open Golf Championship.

Professional wins

Japan Golf Tour wins
1978 Kuzuha Kokusai Tournament
1979 Shizuoka Open
1980 Kanto Pro Championship, Descente Cup Hokkoku Open
1982 Japan Open

Other wins
1978 Nagano Open
1980 Kanagawa Open

Senior wins
2007 Handa Cup Kanto Pro Grand Senior Championship
2008 Kanto Pro Grand Senior Championship
2014 Starts Senior Tournament, Japan Professional Gold Senior Championship Golf Partner Cup

External links

Akira Yabe at the PGA of Japan official website (in Japanese)

Japanese male golfers
Japan Golf Tour golfers
Sportspeople from Tochigi Prefecture
1946 births
Living people
20th-century Japanese people
21st-century Japanese people